Balognathidae is an extinct conodont family.

Genera
Genera are:
 †Amorphognathus
 †Baltoniodus
 †Birksfeldia
 †Icriodella
 †Notiodella
 †Polyplacognathus
 †Prioniodus
 †Promissum
 †Pterospathodus

References

External links 

 Balognatidae at fossilworks.org (retrieved 8 May 2016)

Conodont families
Prioniodontida